Péter Beke (born 6 December 1994) is a Hungarian football player who plays for Kozármisleny.

Club statistics

Updated to games played as of 15 October 2014.

External links
 HLSZ 
 MLSZ 
 

1994 births
Living people
Sportspeople from Pécs
Hungarian footballers
Association football midfielders
Pécsi MFC players
Kozármisleny SE footballers
Szeged-Csanád Grosics Akadémia footballers
Dorogi FC players
Nemzeti Bajnokság I players
Nemzeti Bajnokság II players
Nemzeti Bajnokság III players
21st-century Hungarian people